The Chart Show (also known as The ITV Chart Show between 1989 and 1998) was a popular weekly syndicated music video programme which ran in the United Kingdom from April 1986 until August 1998, with revivals in 2003 and 2008–2009.

The Chart Show  originally ran in the United Kingdom on Channel 4 from 11 April 1986 up to 2 January 1989 in a 45-minute-long Friday evening slot (with some episodes in late 1988 airing on Monday evenings due to late schedule changes on the channel).

By the beginning of 1989, the popularity of the show persuaded the show's production team to move it from Channel 4 onto the ITV network. In its ITV transmission run between 7 January 1989 and 22 August 1998, The Chart Show was normally broadcast in the 11:30 am timeslot on ITV on Saturday mornings, with an early morning repeat later in the week in most regions; ITV episodes were generally one hour in length.

From 29 August 1998 onwards, The Chart Show was dropped and replaced by CD:UK, which ran until 2006. The Chart Show name returned to UK television as a short-lived revival by Channel 4 from 6 to 12 January 2003, and a second revival aired from 6 August 2008 to May 2009 on Chart Show TV.

The original production company was Video Visuals, and (when shown on ITV) was credited as "A Yorkshire Television Presentation" from 1993 and 1998 (prior to this, no ITV franchisee's logo was shown at the end).

History

The show was designed to compete with established pop shows such as the BBC's Top of the Pops and was influenced by the video formats of MTV. The show was unique in that it had no presenters, instead computer-generated displays took their place in between promotional videos of artists.

The "pop-up" information snippets were represented as "windows" in a mock-up graphical user interface called HUD. In 1987 this was replaced with the more familiar display which featured a "mouse-pointer" and "icons" generated on an Amiga computer. Although commonplace nowadays, such interfaces were relatively cutting-edge at the time. The look of the icons was updated on the move to ITV on 7 January 1989, and again upon the show's relaunch on 7 December 1991 as part of a competition prize from Amiga Computing magazine. However, this update only lasted one show and the previous 1989 icons returned the following week and lasted until 11 May 1996 when the show's look and production was completely overhauled and was replaced with an animated text banner at the bottom of the screen. (From 3 February 1996, info boxes developed informal humour and tend to use the mark: EXCLUSIVE!)

Graphics mimicking those of a video recorder in operation were also used, and are one of the show's most well remembered features.

The show was very important when it was first launched, being one of the few outlets for music videos on British television, in the days before the widespread takeup of satellite and cable television, and channels such as MTV Europe. Many music videos got their UK Television premieres during The Chart Show.

Shortly after launching, The Chart Show found itself being taken off air during a dispute with the Musicians' Union over the showing of music videos on ITV & Channel 4 which lasted throughout the summer of 1986. During this time, a show called Rewind, made by the same production team, was aired. This consisted of performances from other music shows. The dispute was resolved by the end of the summer, and The Chart Show returned at the end of August.

On Channel 4, the show ran on Friday nights, mainly filling gaps between series of The Tube. After moving to ITV it ran on Saturday mornings and also had a late night repeat in some ITV regions, though the day and time of this varied over time and between regions. One such late night repeat on 31 August 1997 was interrupted to report the breaking news of Diana, Princess of Wales' car accident. The show was so popular that it became a regular with five editions in July 1987 going out as 60-minute long "Summer Specials". The last regular edition to air on Channel 4 was on 30 September 1988. The final episode on Channel 4 was a Review of 1988 special on 2 January 1989; the first edition on ITV aired 5 days later. The show was renamed "The ITV Chart Show" that September after ITV launched its new corporate identity. The name reverted to The Chart Show on 22 October 1994.

Earlier Channel 4 editions were 45 minutes long, and later ones were 60 minutes, but were split into two 30-minute segments before moving to the 60-minute format in 1988. However, some later editions were shortened due to ITV buying rights to Formula One motor racing in 1997.

The last edition was shown on 22 August 1998, after being axed in favour of a live, performance-based show, CD:UK, which began the following week. The show featured various messages from viewers saying goodbye to the show and how upset they were that the show was finishing. There were also messages from artists, including Mel B and Suggs.

The first video on The Chart Show was "What You Need" by INXS.  The Chart Show mistakenly mentioned on the final show that Robert Palmer's Addicted to Love was the first artist to appear on The Chart Show.  The video clip of Robert Palmer with the original graphics on, shown on the last episode, was taken from the 4th episode, rather than the first, as revealed by the date shown in the H.U.D.

In the show's later days, the programme was broadcast "live", with all the elements of the show programmed into a computer and laid back to tape, the song title graphics and info banners being added live as the show was broadcast. This fact was played up over the first few months of the show being made this way, with a "Live" graphic appearing at the beginning of each part, in addition to the interactive Battle of the Bands segment. Both of these were dropped after a minor revamp in 1997, although live phone-in competitions continued to appear occasionally until the end of the show's run.

A Different Chart

Confusion often arose from the chart used on the show, as they initially used the chart compiled by MRIB (which was used at the time by commercial radio, and was adopted by NME in 1988) and later on compiled their own chart, as opposed to using the "official" Gallup/CIN chart used by BBC Radio 1, which in addition to the show's initial Friday and later Saturday airdate (therefore not taking account of the full week's sales) meant that the chart shown was different, sometimes slightly, other times more significantly, from that broadcast by Radio 1. Indeed, there were many occasions when the single shown to be Number One by The Chart Show differed from the official number one- including on the show's very first top 10 countdown in May 1987.

No Videos

Many singles featured in the charts had no music videos produced for them. Most of these songs were in the specialist charts, though they occasionally appeared in the Top Ten.

In the early years, the problem was solved by showing a photo of the artist over a short excerpt from the song. As the show progressed, they had produced many various computer-generated sequences to accompany the audio clips. These included onscreen games of pong, close-ups of turntables playing, cars being crushed, silhouettes of people dancing, lava lamps amongst other stock footage. Due to the lack of an actual music video, the songs in question were never played in full.

There were exceptions to this; the first being Ride on Time by Black Box. The music video wasn't completed for several months after the song was released. In its first week at number one on the Top Ten, a photo of Catherine Quinol, the band's vocalist, was shown over a short excerpt from the single. However, as it was still number one the following week, a performance that was filmed for then Saturday morning show Ghost Train was shown, which had Catherine and an unknown organist performing on a stage.

Another exception was Always by Bon Jovi. The music video wasn't shown two weeks after being first played. In its first week at number one on the Rock Chart which aired on 17 September 1994, slowed-down clips of Keep the Faith were shown.

Another notable example was Music Sounds Better with You by Stardust. This was number one on 15 August 1998 edition of the show and, similarly to Ride on Time, the music video wasn't completed until several months later. This time, a montage of past graphics from the show was put together, partially in response to viewer requests to see old graphics before the final episode.

In 1997, The Verve had refused to allow the Chart Show to show the video for their single Lucky Man. When the song was mentioned in the top ten and in the indie chart, a message was shown on the screen explaining that they refused to let the video appear on the show, unless the show was redesigned. It remains unclear whether or not The Verve took a dislike to the new look show, or if the band simply wanted the video to be shown clean and uninterrupted. Accompanying both messages was the music that had been used to introduce the 'Worst Video' on the end of year specials.

This was the message that appeared on 6 December 1997 Indie Chart:

"Okay everybody... No change from last week. The band and their manager Jazz are still refusing to let us show their video unless we redesign the show for them. In the words of Vanilla... 'No way, no way, Ma Numma Nah."

Vanilla then went on to coincidently win the 'Worst Video of 1997' award with the song referenced in the caption, 'No Way No Way', in the end of year special.

Sometimes, when an artist didn't have a video for their single, footage of a previous video would be used, and sometimes slowed down or distorted to accompany the track that had no video or a live performance of the single.  One notable example was Pearl Jam: From 1993 to 1997, Pearl Jam refused to make promo videos for their singles, and so The Chart Show often used footage from the band's "Even Flow" video to accompany a few seconds of their singles from that time, whenever they appeared on the Rock Chart. Apart from when Spin the Black Circle had first appeared in which the clip would be a distorted piece of their previous video, Alive.

Sponsorships

The show had three sponsors over the span of its life. These were Pepe Jeans (1991–1992), Twix between (1993–1996) and Tizer (1997). Tizer also sponsored The Chart Show's replacement, CD:UK, for several years. Unlike most sponsorships on UK television, these were incorporated into the show's titles as opposed to being shown as separate clips wrapped around the show in questions.

When Tizer became the new sponsor, the stings caused criticism as they were played at random moments during the titles and end credits, interrupting the show deliberately. Due to the irritation this caused, they were eventually dropped so that the show would run clean.

As part of 'The Vault' repeats, the sponsorships are now either blurred or edited out of the title sequences/end credits to avoid controversy.

Vault Repeats

Satellite channel The Vault began repeating 1991–92 and 1996–97 episodes from December 2006 on Saturday mornings, similar to the shows original timeslot on ITV, though not in chronological order. The first episode to be broadcast was the 1992 special. The Vault also aired repeats of the repeats on the following Thursday. Due to the sponsors of the show being included in the show's titles, The Vault had to re-edit the episodes and blur out the sponsors' logos, as they are no longer affiliated with the show. The Video Visuals logo was also cut from the episodes despite Video Visuals being part of CSC Media Group, which owns and operates The Vault. The repeats also aired without the channel's "V" graphic in the corner of the screen, but on-screen competition graphics were aired and proved unpopular with viewers - such competition graphics still air to this day across the CSC Media Group network. On several occasions, episodes were cut off abruptly to unplanned commercial breaks and blank screens, and some airings were accidentally ones that had already been shown on The Vault's run of the show. One scheduled episode failed to air completely and was replaced with another programme, which led to a double bill being shown the following weekend.

The Vault has yet to air pre–1990 editions of the show or editions from 1993 to 1995 as said episodes were (and still are to this day) stored on unplayable formats, and the network does not have compatible machines equipped to play the episodes. The shows were allowed to be converted, but the conversions were apparently very expensive, and the chances of The Vault converting the episodes depended on the popularity of the repeats. However viewing figures began to drop, which led to the showings being axed in July 2007, and the incompatible editions of the show were ultimately not converted.

In March 2008, Classic Chart Show returned to The Vault by popular demand. Unlike the previous run, the repeats were not advertised; the news only broke on The Vault's website. However, only four episodes were broadcast - two reportedly from the last run of repeats and two new repeats that suffered technical problems, one of which consisted of the first part being repeated three times. The repeats were axed the following month, and it remains unknown what the reason behind the axing was. Eventually, on 19 May 2008, a post by a forum administrator on The Vault's website stated that The Vault were "we're making a few changes to [their] schedule at the moment - rest assured the Chart Show repeats will be back, but we don't have a date set for them yet." The same admin also stated that The Vault were considering converting incompatible episodes. Eventually, the repeats returned for a third time on Friday 28 November 2008, though re-edited. Instead of blurring the sponsor's logo during the title sequence, scenes displaying the sponsor are entirely cut, and the show starts from when the logo disappears. Forum users on Digital Spy claim that the run consists of, yet again, only a handful of episodes being played repeatedly. On 17 January 2009, a scheduled episode of the show failed to air for unknown reasons, and a regular run of music videos took its place. Since May 2010, the Vault have been showing repeats of Chart Show episodes from 1997 and 1998 on the channel each day, at 3 pm and 10 pm.

Format Revivals

Channel 4
For two weeks in January 2003, The Chart Show returned to Channel 4 in 60-minute segments in the morning, although these followed a different format, with a voiceover and absent of the faux video recorder graphics that the show was well known for. A similarly formatted version also ran on Chart Show TV during its first few months on air.

Chart Show TV
On 6 August 2008, a revival of The Chart Show aired on Chart Show TV. This version is somewhat closer to the original format than that of the short-lived 2003 version.

The revival retains some of the original features of the show, including the faux video recorder graphics and the Video Vault, including the original 1996 ident. New features include an Airplay Chart, Urban Chart, Download Chart and Interactive Chart. An NME TV Video Chart features which consists of music video as voted by users of the NME TV website. The traditional specialist charts, Dance, Rock and Indie, are expected to appear under new identities, as the second episode featured a Flaunt Dance Chart. If this is correct, the Rock Chart would become the Scuzz Rock Chart. It is unknown what identity would carry with the Indie Chart as NME TV, which is based around indie music, has its own video chart. Artist interviews is now a regular feature, under the name "Chart Show Meets...". Neither The Chart News or Hot Shot feature in this run.

End-of-year specials
Excluding 1994, the show would have an 'end-of-year' episode that featured 'best' and 'worst' awards as well as countdowns of the best-selling songs of the year.

Winners:

Best New Act
 1986 - The Housemartins - Happy Hour
 1987 - Wet Wet Wet - Sweet Little Mystery
 1988 - The Pasadenas - Tribute (Right On)
 1989 - The Beautiful South - You Keep It All In
 1990 - Beats International - Dub Be Good To Me
 1991 - Kenny Thomas - Outstanding
 1992 - Tasmin Archer - Sleeping Satellite
 1993 - Jamiroquai - Too Young To Die
 1995 - Supergrass - Alright
 1996 - Spice Girls - Say You'll Be There
 1997 - The Seahorses - Blinded by the Sun (as voted by the public)

Best Solo Artist
 1988 - Tracy Chapman - Fast Car
 1989 - Lisa Stansfield - All Around The World
 1990 - Harry Connick, Jr. - We Are in Love
 1991 - Seal - Crazy
 1992 - Curtis Stigers - I Wonder Why
 1993 - Björk - Big Time Sensuality
 1995 - Alanis Morissette - Hand in My Pocket
 1996 - Louise  - Undivided Love
 1997 - Sheryl Crow - Everyday Is A Winding Road (as voted by the public)

Best Video of the Year
 1986 - Peter Gabriel - Sledgehammer
 1987 - New Order - True Faith
 1988 - Siouxsie and the Banshees - Peek-A-Boo
 1989 - Fine Young Cannibals - She Drives Me Crazy
 1990 - Paula Abdul - Opposites Attract
 1991 - Shakespears Sister - Goodbye Cruel World
 1992 - R.E.M. - Man on the Moon
 1993 - Peter Gabriel - Kiss That Frog
 1995 - Gavin Friday - Angel
 1996 - Jamiroquai - Virtual Insanity
 1997 - Various Artists - Perfect Day (as voted by the public)

Best Foreign Video
 1986 - Prince - Kiss
 1987 - Crowded House - Don't Dream Its Over
 1988 - Toni Childs - Don't Walk Away
 1989 - Malcolm McLaren - Waltz Darling

Best Band
 1997 - Texas - Say What You Want (as voted by the public)

Best Director
 1993 - Terence Trent D'Arby - She Kissed Me
 1995 - Tricky - Overcome

Worst Video of The Year
 1986 - Frankie Goes to Hollywood - Rage Hard
 1987 - Anita Dobson - Talking of Love
 1988 - Shakin' Stevens - True Love
 1989 - Edelweiss - I Can't Get No... Edelweiss
 1990 - David Hasselhoff - Crazy for You
 1991 - Barry Manilow - Jingle Bells
 1992 - The Troggs - Wild Thing
 1993 - Dusty Springfield & Cilla Black - Heart And Soul
 1995 - Denise Welch - You Don't Have To Say You Love Me
 1996 - Peter Ebdon - I Am A Clown
 1997 - Vanilla - No Way No Way

Funniest Video of the Year
 1988 - "Weird Al" Yankovic - Fat
 1989 - Bananarama with French and Saunders - Help
 1990 - DJ Jazzy Jeff & The Fresh Prince - I Think I Can Beat Mike Tyson

Dance Chart
 1986 - Cameo - Word Up
 1987 - Rick Astley - Never Gonna Give You Up
 1988 - Yazz and the Plastic Population - The Only Way Is Up
 1989 - A Guy Called Gerald - Voodoo Ray
 1990 - Adamski - Killer
 1991 - Bizarre Inc - Playing With Knives
 1992 - Snap - Rhythm Is A Dancer

Best Dance Video
 1997 (Voted by the public)
 1. Puff Daddy & Faith Evans - I'll Be Missing You
 2. Dario G - Sunchyme
 3. Jamiroquai - Alright

Indie Chart
 1986 - The Smiths - Panic
 1987 - M/A/R/R/S - Pump Up The Volume
 1988 - Yazz and the Plastic Population - The Only Way Is Up
 1989 - Inspiral Carpets - Joe
 1990 - Happy Mondays - Step On
 1991 - Curve - Frozen E.P.
 1992 - Suede - The Drowners

Best Indie Video
 1993 - The Smashing Pumpkins - Today
 1995 - Björk - It's Oh So Quiet
 1996 - Rocket From The Crypt - On A Rope
 1997 (Voted by the public)
 1. Super Furry Animals - Play It Cool
 2. Oasis - Stand By Me
 3. Suede - Saturday Night

Heavy Metal/Rock Chart
 1986 - Bon Jovi - You Give Love A Bad Name
 1987 - Heart - Alone
 1988 - Iron Maiden - Can I Play With Madness
 1989 - Metallica - One
 1990 - Faith No More - Epic
 1991 - Bryan Adams - Everything I Do
 1992 - Ugly Kid Joe - Everything About You

Best Rock Video
 1997 (Voted by the public)
 1. Skunk Anansie - Hedonism
 2. Reef - Place Your Hands
 3. Green Day - Hitchin a Ride

Network Album Chart
 1986 - Dire Straits - Brothers in Arms
 1987 - U2 - Joshua Tree

Network Singles/The Top Ten/Top Twenty
 1986 - Nick Berry - Every Loser Wins
 1987 - Rick Astley - Never Gonna Give You Up
 1988 - Womack & Womack - Teardrops
 1989 - Black Box - Ride on Time
 1990 - Adamski - Killer
 1991 - Bryan Adams - Everything I Do
 1992 - Snap - Rhythm Is A Dancer
 1993 - 2 Unlimited - No Limit
 1995 - Celine Dion - Think Twice
 1996 - Mark Morrison - Return of the Mack
 1997 - Various Artists - Perfect Day

See also
Chart Show Channels
Chart Show TV
The Vault
B4 (music show)

References
Citations

Sources

External links

1986 British television series debuts
2009 British television series endings
1980s British music television series
1990s British music television series
2000s British music television series
British music chart television shows
British television series revived after cancellation
Channel 4 original programming
English-language television shows
ITV (TV network) original programming
Pop music television series